Paul Ardenne (born 4 October 1956) is Professor of history at the University of Amiens, and is also an art critic and a curator in the field of contemporary art.

He grew up in a family of farmers from Charente (for a while he, too, worked in farming), he studied literature, history and philosophy at the University of Poitiers and University of Toulouse, before completing a doctorate in history of art with Laurence Bertrand Dorléac at the University of Paris I (Contemporary Fine Art – Forms and Constraints). In Paris, he encountered the future contemporary art curator, Ami Barak, as well as Catherine Millet, founder/director of Art Press and José Alvarez, director of the publishing label Regard, three figures whose positions on aesthetics influenced his own views.

Works 
Essays
 Capc-musée 1973-1993, Editions du Regard, 1993
 La Création contemporaine entre structures et système, Publications de l’École des Beaux-arts de Rouen, 1996
 Analyser l’art vivant, s’il se peut (un constat de balbutiement), Publications de l’École des Arts décoratifs de Strasbourg, 1997
 Art, l’âge contemporain : une histoire des arts plastiques à la fin du 20ème siècle, Éditions du Regard, 1997
 Catherine Poncin, Filigranes Editions, 1999
 Patrick Mimran, Babel TV, Éditions du Regard, 1999
 L’Art dans son moment politique, La Lettre volée, 2000
 L’Image Corps - Figures de l’humain dans l’art du 20ème siècle, Éditions du Regard, 2001 (Grand Prix de l’Académie de Dijon)
 Un Art contextuel, Flammarion, 2002 ; rééd. coll. « Champs », 2004
 Codex Rudy Ricciotti, Birkhäuser/Ante Prima, 2003
 I setti Panazzi celesti Anselm Kiefer, Éditions du Regard, 2004
 Manuelle Gautrand: architectures, Éditions Infolio, 2005
 Topiques/Topics Alain Sarfati architecte/architect, Ante Prima-Éditions du Layeur, 2005
 Terre habitée : humain et urbain à l’ère de la mondialisation, Archibooks, 2005
 Contacts (l’architecture de Philippe Gazeau), Ante Prima-AAM, 2006
 Extrême : esthétiques de la limite dépassée, Flammarion, 2006
 Pierre et Gilles, Taschen, 2007
 Lorient, Cité de la voile Eric Tabarly, Éd. Archives d’Architecture Moderne, 2008
 Palais du Cinéma à Venise, 5+1AA, Rudy Riciotti, Éd. Archives d’Architecture Moderne, 2008
 Cityrama FGP, Archibooks, 2008
 Art, le présent : la création plastique au tournant du 20ème siècle, Éditions du Regard, 2009
 Peintures. Please pay attention please, avec Barbara Polla, Éditions La Muette, 2010
 Moto, notre amour, Flammarion, 2010

Novels
 La Halte, QUE, 2003.
 Nouvel Âge, QUE-Le Grand Miroir, 2007.
  
In collaboration
 with Jacques Coulais, Opus, Figuier, 1990
 with Ami Barak, Guide Europe des musées d’art moderne et contemporain, Art Press, 1994
 1989, ouvrage collectif sous la direction de P. Ardenne, Éditions du Regard, 1995
 with Pascal Beausse and Laurent Goumarre, Pratiques contemporaines : l’art comme expérience, Dis-Voir, 1999
 with Alice Laguarda, Christian Hauvette architecte, Éd. Jean-Michel Place, 2001
 La Passion de la victime (coll.), QUE, 2003
 with Élisabeth Nora, Portraiturés, Éditions du Regard, 2003
 Ouvrir Couvrir (coll.), Verdier, 2004
 with Pierre Assouline, Anselm Kiefer au Grand Palais, Éditions du Regard, 2007
 with Régis Durand, Images-monde : de l’événement au documentaire, Monografik, 2007
 with Sebastian Redecke, Brunet Saunier : Architecture, au-delà des apparences, Ante Prima, 2007
 with Alfonso Fermia, Gianluca Peluffo, Ernesta Caviola, Sebastian Redecke et Vittorio Savi, Le Nombril des Rêves, Ante Prima, 2008
 with Jean-Luc Monterosso, Pierre Restany et Nam June Paik, Catherine Ikam | Louis Fléri, Monografik, 2008
 with Andrea Bruciati, Paolo Colombo, Joseph del Pesco and Barbara Polla, Andrea Mastrovito | Tigres de papier, Monografik, 2008
 with Barbara Polla, Working Men : le travail dans l'art contemporain, Éd. QUE, 2008
 with Sophie Nemoz, Dernières nouvelles, Architecture et habitat étudiant en Europe, Éd. Archives d’architecture moderne, 2008–2009
 with Laurent Sfar and Nathalie Leleu, Interloperie, Éd. Filigranes, 2009
 with Ernesta Caviol, Qu'est-ce qu'il y a dans le frigo ? 5+1AA Archi, Éd. Archives d’architecture moderne, 2009
 
Curator
 Micropolitiques (Centre National d’Art Contemporain Le Magasin Grenoble, 2000, avec Christine Macel)
 Expérimenter le réel (Albi-Montpellier 2001-2002)
 La Force de l’art (Grand Palais, Paris, 2006; “Plutôt que l’exposé d’un manifeste, je veux mettre en valeur la principale qualité culturelle de l’art contemporain : sa vocation persistante à l’ "interposition” ”)
 Working men (Galerie Analix Forever, Genève, 2008)
 Prélèvements Urbains, Patrick Mimran (Passage de Retz, Paris, Novembre 2008)

References

See also
Author's blog
"ENTRETIEN AVEC PAUL ARDENNE", Revue 17
Contemporary art

1956 births
Living people
French art curators
French art historians
French art critics
French male non-fiction writers